Hindi–Urdu (Devanagari: ,) (also known as Hindustani) is the lingua franca of Northern India and Pakistan (together classically known as Hindostan). Hindi is officially registered in modern India as a standard written using Devanagari script, and Urdu is officially registered in modern Pakistan as a standard written using extended Perso-Arabic script.

Hindi–Urdu transliteration (or Hindustani transliteration) is essential for Hindustani speakers to understand each other's text, and especially important since the underlying language of both the Hindi & Urdu registers are almost the same. Transliteration is theoretically possible because of the common Hindustani phonology underlying Hindi-Urdu. In present day, the Hindustani language is seen as a unifying language, as initially proposed by Mahatma Gandhi to resolve the Hindi–Urdu controversy. ("Hindustani" is not to be confused with followers of Hinduism, as 'Hindu' in Persian means 'Indo')

Technically, a direct one-to-one script mapping or rule-based lossless transliteration of Hindi-Urdu is not possible, majorly since Hindi is written in an abugida script and Urdu is written in an abjad script, and also other constraints like multiple similar characters from Perso-Arabic which map onto a single character in Devanagari. However, there have been dictionary-based mapping attempts which have yielded very high accuracy, providing near-to-perfect transliterations. For literary domains, a mere transliteration between Hindi-Urdu will not suffice as formal Hindi is more inclined towards Sanskrit vocabulary whereas formal Urdu is more inclined towards Persian and Arabic vocabulary; hence a system combining transliteration and translation would be necessary for such cases.

In addition to Hindi-Urdu, there have been attempts to design Indo-Pakistani transliteration systems for digraphic languages like Sindhi (written in extended Perso-Arabic in Sindh of Pakistan and in Devanagari by Sindhis in partitioned India), Punjabi (written in Gurmukhi in East Punjab and Shahmukhi in West Punjab), Saraiki (written in extended-Shahmukhi script in Saraikistan and unofficially in Sindhi-Devanagari script in India) and Kashmiri (written in extended Perso-Arabic by Kashmiri Muslims and extended-Devanagari by Kashmiri Hindus).

Vowels

Consonants 

Hindustani has a rich set of consonants in its full-alphabet, since it has a mixed-vocabulary (rekhta) derived from Old Hindi (from Dehlavi), with loanwords from Parsi (from Pahlavi) and Arabic languages, all of which itself are from 3 different language-families respectively: Indo-Aryan, Iranian and Semitic.

The following table provides an approximate one-to-one mapping for Hindi-Urdu consonants, especially for computational purposes (lossless script conversion). Note that this direct script conversion will not yield correct spellings, but rather a readable text for both the readers. Note that Hindi–Urdu transliteration schemes can be used for Punjabi language as well, for Gurmukhi (East Punjabi) to Shahmukhi (West Punjabi) conversion, since Shahmukhi is a superset of Urdu alphabets (with 2 extra consonants) and Gurmukhi font can be easily converted to Devanagari font.

Sanskrit consonants 

The following consonants are mostly used in words that are directly borrowed or adapted from Sanskrit.

Implosive consonants 

These consonants are mostly found only in languages like Saraiki.

Numerals

Punctuations & Symbols

Sample text 

The following is an excerpt from the Hindostani poem Tarānah-e-Hindi written by Muhammad Iqbal.

See also

 Uddin and Begum Hindustani Romanisation
 Sindhi transliteration
 Hindustan (Indo subcontinent)

References 

Hindustani language
Hindustani orthography
Transliteration
Urdu
Hindi